Jadwiga Janus (21 October 1931 – 9 March 2019) was a Polish sculptor.

Biography
Janus was born in Stadnicka Wola, Poland. In 1957, she graduated from the Jan Matejko Academy of Fine Arts in Kraków, under professor Xawery Dunikowski.

Monuments
Monument Pogromcom hitleryzmu in  Wieluń, (1966)
Monument Władysław Żarski in Piotrków Trybunalski, (1969)
Monument Martyrologii Dzieci in Łódź, (1971)
Monument Nicolaus Copernicus in Łódź, (2002)

In collections
National Museum, Warsaw.
Polish Sculpture Center.
Museum in Łódź.
Museum Sztuki Medalierskiej in Wrocław.
Museum Leon Wyczółkowski in Bydgoszcz.
Wielkopolskie Muzeum Walk Niepodległościowych.

Film (documentary)
2005: Inspirations ("Inspiracje") -- as herself

Prizes
1968: Monument Martyrologii Dzieci Łódź.- I Prize.
1973: Monument Czynu Rewolucyjnego in Łódź. -I Prize.
1975  monument Bohaterów Walk o Wał Pomorski -Prize

Gallery

References

1931 births
2019 deaths
20th-century Polish women artists
20th-century Polish sculptors
21st-century Polish sculptors
21st-century Polish women artists
Modern sculptors
Polish women sculptors
Recipients of the Silver Medal for Merit to Culture – Gloria Artis